The 2017 UC Davis football team represented the University of California, Davis as a member of the Big Sky Conference during the 2017 NCAA Division I FCS football season. Led by first-year head coach Dan Hawkins, UC Davis compiled an overall record of 5–6 with a mark of 3–5 in conference play, placing eighth in the Big Sky. The Aggies played home games at Aggie Stadium in Davis, California.

Previous season
The Aggies finished the 2016 season 3–8, 2–6 in Big Sky play to finish in a four-way tie for ninth place.

On November 21, 2016, head coach Ron Gould was fired. He finished at UC Davis with a four-year record of 12–33. On November 30, the school hired Dan Hawkins as head coach.

Schedule

Despite Portland State also being a member of the Big Sky Conference, the September 16 game against UC Davis was considered a non-conference game.

Game summaries

at San Diego State

San Diego

at Portland State

at Weber State

North Dakota

Eastern Washington

at Northern Arizona

Cal Poly

at Idaho State

Southern Utah

at Sacramento State

References

UC Davis
UC Davis Aggies football seasons
UC Davis Aggies football